Cannonball (stylized on-screen as Cannonball!, and released theatrically in the UK as Carquake) is a 1976 American comedy film directed by Paul Bartel and starring David Carradine. The film is one of two released in 1976 that were based on a real illegal cross-continent road race that took place for a number of years in the United States (the other being The Gumball Rally). The same topic later became the basis for the films The Cannonball Run, Cannonball Run II and Speed Zone. The film was written and directed by Paul Bartel, who also directed Death Race 2000.

The name of the film and the plot were inspired by Erwin G. "Cannon Ball" Baker (1882–1960), who traveled across the United States several times, and by the Cannonball Baker Sea-To-Shining-Sea Memorial Trophy Dash, an illegal cross-continent road race introduced by Brock Yates to protest against the 55 MPH speed limit.

Plot
The Trans-America Grand Prix is an illegal race held every year between Los Angeles (Santa Monica Pier) and New York City. Recently released from jail, where he was serving a sentence for killing a girl while driving drunk, racing driver Coy "Cannonball" Buckman (David Carradine) hopes to win the race and get his career back on track. Racing team Modern Motors have promised a contract to either him or his arch-rival Cade Redman (Bill McKinney) who is also in the race – the contract will go to whichever of them wins. Coy is still on probation and when his parole officer, Linda Maxwell (Veronica Hamel), with whom he is having an elaborate affair, discovers he will be crossing state lines in violation of his parole, she attempts to stop him, only to have him force her to accompany him on the race.

Redman also has company in the form of country singer Perman Waters (Gerrit Graham) and his manager Sharma Capri (Judy Canova) who have agreed to pay Redman's race expenses in return for his taking them with him to New York in his Dodge Charger.

Other competitors include teenage surfer sweethearts Jim Crandell (Robert Carradine) and Maryann (Belinda Balaski) driving Maryann's father's Chevrolet Corvette, middle-aged Terry McMillan in a Chevrolet Blazer, three sexy waitresses, Sandy (Mary Woronov), Ginny (Glynn Rubin) and Wendy (Diane Lee Hart) in a souped-up van, arrogant German driver Wolfe Messer (James Keach) in a De Tomaso Pantera, preppy African-American Beutell (Stanley Bennett Clay) in a Lincoln Continental he has been hired by a wealthy elderly couple to transport to New York for them (unaware that he is using it to enter the race) and Buckman's best friend Zippo (Archie Hahn) in a Pontiac Trans Am identical to Coy's. Unbeknown to Coy, his brother Bennie (Dick Miller) has bet heavily on the race and plans to use underhand methods to ensure Coy wins.

As the race degenerates into a violent demolition derby, Messer is blown up by Bennie, while McMillan attempts to cheat by having his Blazer flown from LAX to New York's LaGuardia Airport where he waits out the race with his mistress Louisa (Louisa Moritz). Beutell's borrowed Lincoln gets progressively more damaged as the race goes on, while Jim and Maryann face engine trouble with a broken fan belt. The rivalry between Coy and the increasingly unstable Redman gets out of control as the two fight and attempt to force each other off the road, with Coy crashing his Trans Am after Redman breaks the headlights. Switching to a 1969 Ford Mustang he borrows from some local hot-rodders, Coy has a last showdown with Redman, who has kicked Perman and Sharma out of his car after arguing with them. A piece of Perman's guitar, which Redman smashed in a rage after getting sick of Perman's singing and on-the-road radio broadcasts, gets lodged behind the car pedals, causing Redman to lose control and crash over the side of an unfinished bridge. He dies when the car explodes.

Bennie meanwhile, has sent a gunman to kill the driver of the "other" red Trans Am as it is beating Coy. He is unaware that the driver is Zippo or that Linda is now riding with him, as Coy thought it safer for her to do so since Redman was after him. While with Zippo, she has found out that it was Zippo who was driving the car in which the girl was killed, not Coy. Coy took the blame because he knew the weaker Zippo would never survive in jail.

Bennie's gunman shoots Zippo dead and the Trans Am crashes and explodes. Linda jumps clear, but is badly injured. Jim and Maryann see the wreck and pick up the comatose Linda, taking her to hospital. Behind them, the presence of the wrecked Trans Am on the freeway causes a multiple-car pileup.

Terry McMillan and Louisa arrive first at the finish line, but Louisa lets slip that the Blazer was flown there and he is disqualified. The girls in the van and Coy are neck-and-neck as they cross into New York City (with Coy driving over the George Washington Bridge and the girls taking the Lincoln Tunnel until Sandy attempts to take a shortcut when the girls get lost and are stuck in traffic and the van crashes. Coy arrives at the finish line and is about to stamp his timecard, making him the official winner, when he is told about Zippo and Linda's accident and realizes Bennie caused it. He tears up his timecard so it can't be stamped and gives the pieces to Bennie, who is taken away by gangster Lester Marks (played by the film's director Paul Bartel) to whom he owes all the money he bet on Coy, presumably to be killed. Assured of his racing contract, Coy is taken to the hospital to be reunited with Linda by the team manager. Having decided to finish the race in spite of believing they cannot win having lost so much time, Jim and Maryann are the next to arrive at the finish line. They are surprised and overjoyed to be told they are the winners of the $100,000 first place prize.

At the hospital, Coy and Linda enjoy their reunion, while Beutell delivers the Lincoln – now completely wrecked – to its horrified owners in front of a hotel in the city.

Cast

 David Carradine - Coy "Cannonball" Buckman
 Bill McKinney - Cade Redman, Cannonball's nemesis
 Veronica Hamel - Linda Maxwell, Cannonball's parole officer and love interest
 Gerrit Graham - Perman Waters
 Robert Carradine - Jim Crandell
 Belinda Balaski - Maryann
 Mary Woronov - Sandy Harris (Girl in the Van #1)
 Diane Lee Hart - Wendy (Girl in the Van #2)
 Glynn Rubin - Ginny (Girl in the Van #3)
 James Keach - Wolf Messer, the West German professional
 Dick Miller - Bennie Buckman, Cannonball's older brother
 Paul Bartel - Lester Marks
 Stanley Bennett Clay - Beutell Morris
 Judy Canova - Sharma Capri, Perman's manager
 Archie Hahn - Zippo, Cannonball's friend
 Carl Gottlieb - Terry McMillan
 David Arkin - Dennis Caldwell
 Louisa Moritz - Louisa
 Patrick Wright - Brad Phillips, organizer of the Trans-American Grand Prix
 Joe Dante - Kid
 Allan Arkush - Panama
 Jonathan Kaplan - All-Night Gas Station Attendant
 Roger Corman - Los Angeles County District Attorney
 Don Simpson - L.A. County Assistant District Attorney
 Martin Scorsese - Mafioso #1
 Sylvester Stallone - Mafioso #2 (uncredited)

The cameo by Sylvester Stallone is uncredited, while Roger Corman and Don Simpson appear as district attorneys. Directors Joe Dante, Jonathan Kaplan, Allan Arkush and Martin Scorsese have cameos, and former beach movie star and Transformers voice actor Aron Kincaid appears in a small role as one of two cops who pull over the girls in the van.

Production

Development
Bartel later said he worked for a year on Death Race 2000 for $5,000 "so when it was finished I desperately needed money. The only thing anybody wanted from me was another car picture, hence Cannonball. Corman had drummed into me the idea that if Death Race had been "harder" and "more real" it would have been more popular. Like a fool, I believed him". Bartel says: "I am not, and never have been, very much interested in cars and racing" so he decided to load up the film "cameos and character gimmicks that did interest me". His favourite scene was the one where Bartel, playing a nightclub owner, plays the piano and sings while two gangsters beat up Dick Miller.

See also
The Gumball Rally (1976)
The Cannonball Run (1981)

References

External links
 
 
 
 
 Cannonball at the Internet Movie Cars Database (IMCDb)
 Cannonball Run World Events

1976 films
American road comedy-drama films
1970s road comedy-drama films
1970s English-language films
American auto racing films
Films directed by Paul Bartel
1976 comedy films
1976 drama films
1970s American films